Paternáin is a locality and council located in the municipality of Cizur, in Navarre province, Spain, Spain. As of 2020, it has a population of 387.

Geography 
Paternáin is located 9km west-southwest of Pamplona.

References

Populated places in Navarre